The  was a carrier air group (later converted to airbase garrison unit) of the Imperial Japanese Navy (IJN) during the Pacific campaign of World War II.

Structure
Higher unit
3rd Fleet (15 February 1944–9 July 1944)
1st Carrier Division (10 July 1944–9 February 1945)
3rd Air Fleet (10 February 1945–postwar.)
Lower unit
161st Fighter Squadron (10 July 1944–15 November 1944)
162nd Fighter Squadron (10 July 1944–15 November 1944)
308th Fighter Squadron (20 February 1945–postwar.)
310th Fighter Squadron (20 February 1945–postwar.)
402nd Fighter Squadron (5 March 1945–20 April 1945)
1st Attack Squadron (20 February 1945–postwar.)
161st Attack Squadron (10 July 1944–15 November 1944)
254th Attack Squadron (20 February 1945–5 March 1945)
262nd Attack Squadron (10 July 1944–14 November 1944)
61st Reconnaissance Squadron (10 July 1944–15 November 1944)

Commanding officers
Cdr. / RADM* Irisa Toshiie (52) - 15 February 1944 - 19 June 1944 (KIA; posthumous two-rank promotion.)
Cdr. Irisa was jointly Air Officer of CV Taiho, and was KIA in her sinking.
VACANT - 19 June 1944 - 10 July 1944
Cdr. / Capt. Suzuki Masakazu (52) - 10 July 1944 - 10 February 1945 (Captain on 15 October 1944.)
Cdr. / Capt. Sugiyama Toshikazu (51) - 10 February 1945 - 15 August 1945 (Captain on 1 May 1945.)

Bibliography
Shin-Jinbutsuoraisha Co., Ltd., Tōkyō, Japan.
Kingendaishi Hensankai, Military history of the Imperial Japanese Navy Air Groups and Imperial Japanese Army Flying Regiments, 2001, .
Rekishi Dokuhon, Document of the war No. 48 Overview of Imperial Japanese Navy Admirals, 1999, .
The Japanese Modern Historical Manuscripts Association, Organizations, structures and personnel affairs of the Imperial Japanese Army & Navy, University of Tokyo Press, Tōkyō, Japan, 1971, .
Rekishi Gunzō, History of Pacific War, Gakken, Tōkyō, Japan.
Vol. 13, Shōkaku class aircraft carrier, 1997, .
Vol. 22, Aircraft carrier Taihō / Shinano, 1999, .
Extra, Perfect guide, The aircraft carriers of the Imperial Japanese Navy & Army, 2003, .
Bunrin-Dō Co., Ltd., Tōkyō, Japan.
Famous airplanes of the world No. 69, Navy Carrier Dive-Bomber "Suisei", 1998, .
Koku-Fan Illustrated No. 42, Japanese Imperial Army & Navy Aircraft Color, Markig, 1988.
Koku-Fan Illustrated Special, Japanese Military Aircraft Illustrated Vol. 2, "Bombers", 1982.
Model Art, Model Art Co. Ltd., Tōkyō, Japan.
No. 406, Special issue Camouflage & Markings of Imperial Japanese Navy Bombers in W.W.II, 1993.
No. 458, Special issue Imperial Japanese Navy Air Force Suicide Attack Unit "Kamikaze", 1995.
No. 553, Special issue I.J.N. Carrier Attack Bomber, 2000.
Japan Center for Asian Historical Records (http://www.jacar.go.jp/english/index.html), National Archives of Japan, Tōkyō, Japan.
Reference Code: C08051771200, Transition table of formation of Imperial Japan Navy Air Units (special establishment) during Pacific War, Japan Demobilization Agency, 1949.

Groups of the Imperial Japanese Navy Air Service
Military units and formations established in 1944